Lottulo (Occitan Lòtol) is a former municipality in Province of Cuneo,  Italy. On 22 January 1929 it was merged into San Damiano Macra.

References

Former municipalities of Piedmont
Frazioni of the Province of Cuneo